Antic Collective is a company which runs roughly 50 pubs in London.

The original company went into administration in 2013 over unpaid debts. Some pubs were closed and the remaining operating pubs were sold to a sister company Gregarious run by Max Alderman and still using the Antic name.

Locations
The majority of Antic's pubs are south of the River Thames. Many are in buildings converted from their former use and names reflect this, such as Effra Social in the former Effra Conservative Club, Brixton.

Antic opened a pub called The Job Centre in 2014 in a former Jobcentre Plus building on Deptford High Street. The choice of name was criticised by locals as "ironic gentrification", with a spokesperson from the Public and Commercial Services Union regarding it as "grossly insulting that they are inviting people to go and enjoy themselves with an ironic nod and wink that this was once a place for poor people".

References

External links
 http://anticlondon.com

Pub chains